Whitney Dancin' Special is the first remix album by American singer Whitney Houston and was released exclusively in Japan on November 1, 1986 by Arista Records. It was manufactured and distributed by Nippon Phonogram during its original release, and by BMG Victor during its re-issue. It includes 5 remixed and 1 instrumental versions of songs from her self-titled debut album. The album peaked at number 14 in the Japanese charts and sold 19,480 copies there.

It was later released on US for the first time as part of Houston's 35th anniversary edition of her debut album. The box set included an alternate version of “You Give Good Love (Extended Dance Version)” with previously unreleased vocalizations. The version was later added as a seventh track to the digital version of the remix album.

Track listing

References

External links 
  at Discogs
  at Discogs

Whitney Houston albums
1985 EPs
1985 remix albums
Albums produced by Narada Michael Walden
Arista Records albums